Addison Township is one of nine townships in DuPage County, Illinois, USA.  As of the 2010 census, its population was 88,612 and it contained 31,820 housing units.

Geography

The township has recently undergone many changes including a complete renovation of its west end connected to Lake St. Many new stores and services were opened.

Cities, towns, villages
 Addison (partial)
 Bensenville (vast majority)
 Elk Grove Village (partial)
 Elmhurst (north quarter)
 Itasca (east three-quarters)
 Lombard (north edge)
 Villa Park (partial)
 Wood Dale

The south west edge of O'Hare in the city of Chicago shown on the map in beige is a separate entity comprising a portion of O'Hare International Airport, and is not part of this township.

Unincorporated towns
 Churchville at 
(This list is based on USGS data and may include former settlements.)

Adjacent Townships
 Elk Grove Township, Cook County (north)
 Schaumburg Township, Cook County (northwest)
 Bloomingdale Township, DuPage County (west)
 Milton Township, DuPage County (southwest)
 York Township, DuPage County (south)
 Proviso Township, Cook County (southeast)
 Leyden Township, Cook County (east)
 Maine Township, Cook County (northeast)

Cemeteries
The township contains these eight cemeteries: Arlington, Churchville, Elm Lawn, Fredens, Mount Emblem, Pet Haven, Saint Pauls Addison and Zion.

Major highways
  Interstate 290
  Interstate 355
  U.S. Route 20
  Illinois Route 19
  Illinois Route 53
  Illinois Route 64
  Illinois Route 83
  Illinois Route 390

Airports and landing strips
 O'Hare International Airport (partial)
 Patten Industries Heliport

Landmarks
 Cricket Creek Forest Preserve of Dupage County
 Fullerton Park Forest Preserve of Dupage County
 Maple Meadows Forest Preserve
 Oak Meadows Golf Course Forest Preserve
 Oak Meadows Golf Course Forest Preserve
 Songbird Slough Forest Preserve
 Wood Dale Grove Forest Preserve

Demographics

School districts
 Elmhurst School District 205
 Addison School District 4
Dupage County High School District 88
 Fenton Community High School District 100

Political districts
 Illinois's 5th congressional district includes Bensenville and Elmhurst. It is represented by Congressman Mike Quigley (D-Chicago).
 Illinois's 8th congressional district includes Addison, Bensenville Itasca, and Wood Dale. It is represented by Congressman Raja Krishnamoorthi (D-Schaumburg).
 State Senate District 23 includes Addison, Itasca, and Wood Dale. It is represented by Senator Tom Cullerton (D-Villa Park).
 State Senate District 24 includes Elmhurst. Senator Chris Nybo (R-Elmhurst).
 State Senate District 39 includes Addison, Bensenville and Wood Dale. Senator Don Harmon (D-Oak Park).
 State House District 45 includes Addison, Itasca, and Wood Dale. It is represented by Representative Christine Winger (R-Wood Dale).
 State House District 46 includes Addison. It is represented by Representative Deb Conroy (D-Villa Park).
 State House District 47 includes Elmhurst. Representative Patricia R. Bellock (R-Hinsdale).
 State House District 77 includes Addison, Bensenville and Wood Dale. It is represented by Representative Kathleen Willis (D-Addison).

Township Officials

Starred years mean the officeholder was initially appointed to position.

References
 
 United States Census Bureau 2008 TIGER/Line Shapefiles
 United States National Atlas

External links

 City-Data.com
 Illinois State Archives
 Township Officials of Illinois

Townships in DuPage County, Illinois
Populated places established in 1849
1849 establishments in Illinois
Townships in Illinois